The terms poverty industry or poverty business refer to a wide range of money-making activities that attract a large portion of their business from the poor. Businesses in the poverty industry often include payday loan centers, pawnshops, rent-to-own centers, casinos, liquor stores, lotteries, tobacco stores,  credit card companies, and bail-bond services. Illegal ventures such as loansharking might also be included. The poverty industry makes roughly US$33 billion a year in the United States. In 2010, elected American federal officials received more than $1.5 million in campaign contributions from poverty-industry donors.

In poorer countries, the poverty industry exploits the bottom of the pyramid and its extent can at times be used as a litmus test to assess the effectiveness of poverty-alleviation initiatives. In some cases, the poverty industry directly takes advantage of poverty-alleviation initiatives (e.g. formal, government-supported microfinance). For example, some moneylenders misrepresent themselves as formal microfinance initiatives or obtain loans from formal microfinance initiatives through deception. They on-lend these loans to micro-entrepreneurs (informal intermediation).

See also
Economic inequality
Ghetto tax
Misery index (economics)
Pay-to-stay (imprisonment)
Predatory lending
Working poor
Poverty Industrial Complex
Wage slavery

References

Further reading

Industries (economics)
Industry